Aftab Iqbal Shamim (born 16 February 1933 in Jhelum, Pakistan) is an Urdu language poet and an educator from Pakistan.

Career
Aftab Iqbal was born in Jhelum, Pakistan in 1933.
Aftab Iqbal Shamim had served as a professor of English literature and language for 33 years at Government Gordon College, Rawalpindi, Pakistan. Meanwhile, he also taught Urdu language and literature to Chinese students at Beijing University for 12 years. His Chinese students have and had served in various high positions such as ambassadors, cultural secretaries, counsellors and high government officials in China and Pakistan.

He started writing Urdu poetry at a very early stage of his life. His poetry has been published with continuity in reputed literary magazines over the years. He has given a new trend to the Urdu poetry. He wrote poetry that was published in literary magazines like Adabi Dunya and Funoon.

Awards and recognition
Pride of Performance Award by the President of Pakistan in 2006.

Selected poems
Farda Nizhad
Zaid Se Mukalma (1982)
Gum Samandar
Mein Nazm Likhta Houn

References

Pakistani poets
People from Jhelum
1933 births
Living people
Government Gordon College alumni
Academic staff of Government Gordon College
Academic staff of Peking University
Pakistani academics
Urdu-language poets from Pakistan
Recipients of the Pride of Performance